OFZ (abbreviation for ) are coupon-bearing federal loan bonds issued by the Russian government. The Ministry of Finance auctions off OFZs to finance the federal budget, or less commonly, to bail out troubled banks. Given their role, they form an essential part of the Russian financial system.

OFZs were introduced in June 1995 to complement the GKO market as an instrument with medium and long-term standing. Inflation-linked OFZ bonds are also issued. In August 1998, the Russian government defaulted on domestically issued debt, including OFZs. In 2012, OFZs were connected to the pan-Europe settlement and clearing system Euroclear.

The share of foreign-held OFZs increased from nearly zero in 2006 to 25% by the end of 2013. As of February 2018, 33.9% of all outstanding OFZs were held by foreigners. By September 2018 the number had dropped to 27%, due to the threat of further US sanctions against the Russian economy.

In February 2022, ING reported that the share of OFZs held by non-Russians has dropped to about 18%, as a result of the Russian recognition of Donetsk and Luhansk People's Republics.

See also
 GKO
 National Settlement Depository

References

External links 
Current volume of GKO-OFZ market at the Bank of Russia website (in English)

Economy of Russia
Government bonds